This is a glossary of acronyms and initials used for aero-engines and aircraft equipment in the Russian Federation and formerly the USSR.  The Latin-alphabet names are phonetic representations of the Cyrillic originals, and variations are inevitable.

Aero engines

Aviadvigatel - Aircraft engine

 - Accessories gearbox

 Avtomaht Tyaghi - auto-throttle

 Avtomaticheskiy vint – automatic pitch [propeller]

 (suffix) Bezredooktornyy - no reduction gearbox [direct-drive]

 - surge prevention system

 - booster

 Dvigatel - engine

 Dopolnityel'nyi Motor – supplementary motor

 - diesel Novikov

 - supplementary lift engine

 Dvukhkonturnyi Turboreaktivnyi Dvigatel – twin-spool gas turbine engine

 - 

 (suffix) Ekonomichnyi - economical

 (suffix) Forseerovannyi - uprated

 Gelikopternyi Turbo-Dvigatel'  - helicopter turboshaft

 - 

 (suffix/prefix) Korotkoresoorsnyi – short service life

 Khimicheskoye Zazhigahniye – chemical ignition

 Motornyi – prefix used for many piston engines prior to use of OKB names [ca. 1940]

 - 

 - 

 - 

 Neftyanoy - of crude oil type (diesel engines)

 - 

  Opeetnaya Raketa – experimental rocket engine

 Opeetnyi Reaktivnyi Motor – experimental reaction motor

 - 

 - piston engine

 Porokhovoy Raketnyi Dvigatel – gunpowder rocket motor

 Porokhovaya Startovaya Raketa – solid fuel rocket booster

 - pulsejet

 - Ramjet

 (suffix) Redooktornyi - geared

 Reaktivnyi – jet-propelled 

 - digital control unit FADEC

 Reaktivnyy Dvigatel – jet engine

 - 

 - 

 -

 Reaktivnyi Dvigatel – jet engine

 (suffix) Regoolator Toorbokompressora – Turbo-charger regulator

  (suffix) -

 (suffix) -

 - 

 (suffix) Sdoov [Pogranichnovo Sloya] – boundary layer blowing/control

 Stendovyy – test-bed engine

 Sistema Izmereniya Otnosheniya Davleniya – pressure-ratio measurement system

 Startovyi Porohovoi Raketny Dvigatel – RATOG rocket assisted take off gear / JATO jet assisted take-off

 - APU

 (suffix) Toorbokompressor - turbocharger

 Toorbokompressor Reaktivnyy Dvigatel – gas Turbine reaction engine

 Toorboreaktivnyi [Dvigatel] – turbojet engine

 - jet engine

 - twin-spool turbojet

 ToorboVintovoy – turboprop/turboshaft

 ToorboVintovoy Dvigatel – turboprop engine

 - turbofan

 - Propfan

 - booster

 Vint F Shaga – variable-pitch propeller

 Vint Izmenyayemovo Shaga – constant speed propeller

 Vint Postoyannovo Shaga - fixed itch propeller

 Vozdooshno-Reaktivnyy Dvigatel – air reaction engine

 Vozdushno-Reaktivny Dvigatel Kompressornyi – air reaction compressor jet

 Vozdooshnyy Vint - airscew / propeller

 Zhidkostnyi Reaktivnyy Dvigatel – liquid fuelled rocket engine

Aero engine design bureaux

Aleksei Dmitriyevich Charomskii

Aleksandr Ivchyenko

Arkhip Mikhailovich Lyul'ka

Mikulin

Mikulin & B.S. Stechkin

Arkadiya Dmitriyevich Shvetsov

Merkulov engines

Soloviev engines

S. S. Balandin

Aleksei Mikhailovich dobrotvorskii

Nikolai Dmitriyevich Kuznetsov

Soloviev [Aviadvigatel]

Dobrynin engines

Klimov engines

Equipment

1.AFA (AeroFotoApparaht – aerial camera)
2. AviatsionnyFotoApparaht - large reconnaissance cameras)

 AeroFotoUStanovka – aerial camera mount)

 - engine driven compressor

 Avtomaticheskaya Kachayushchayasya AeroFotoUstanovka – automatic tilting camera mount

 Aviatsionnaya Katapool'tnaya Oostnovka – aircraft mounted ejector

  - hand driven cine camera

 Aviasionnoye Mahslo Ghidravlicheskoye – aviation hydraulic fluid

 Aviatsionnyy Protivopozharnnyy Opryskivatel – airborne fire-fighting sprayer

 Aviatsionnoye Pooskovoye Oostroystvo - missile launch rail

 Aviatsionnaya Pooskovay Oostanovka, Odinochnaya [dlya snaryadov kalibra] 212 milimetrov – aircraft mounted launcher, single, for 212mm HVAR's

 Avtomaticheskiy Regoolyator Davleniya – automatic pressure regulator

 Avtomaticheskiy Regoolyator Temperatoory – automatic temperature regulator

 Avtomaht Sbrosa Otrazhahteley – automatic chaff and flare dispenser

 - fire suppression system

 - navigation lights

1. Bahloochnyy Derzhahtel'  - beam type [weapons] rack
2. BomboDertchatel – bomb rack

 - cargo winch

 BL Mishen - target winch

 - target winch

 Booksirooyemaya Mishen – towed target

 Bortovoy Obogrevahtel'  – on-board [gasoline] cabin heater

 Blok Vybrosa Pomekh – interference ejector 'Chuff & Fluff'

 Derzhahtel'  - holder

 Desahntnaya Kabina – assault trooper cabin

Type D daylight reconnaissance pod

 Derzhahtel' Osvetitel'nykh Sredstv – racks for means of illumination (flare bomb cassette)

 DoRazvedchik – auxiliary reconnaissance drone/aircraft

 Derzhatel' yahshchichnyy Sredstv Signalizahtsii – box-type rack for signal means

 Elektricheskaya Kasseta Signahl'nykh Patronov - electric signal flare launcher)

 Elektricheskaya Kasseta Signahl'nykh R - electric signal flare launcher

 - multi-function engine indicators

 Elektrichesky Sbrasyvatel – electric bomb release device

 - photo-recording module

 - landing/taxi light

 - retractable landing/taxi lamps

 - fire extinguisher bottle

 Groozvaya Lebyodka - Cargo winch

 - hydraulic pump

 Ghenerahtor Odnofahznyy - generator

 GhermoShlem - pressure helmet

 - generator

- generator

 - generator

 - generator

 Gelikopter Turbo-Dvigatyel – helicopter turbine engine

 (suffix) Instrooktor - instructor

 - electric drive system

1. Kompleks [Vo'orouzheniya] – weapons system
2. - non braking nose-wheel

 (suffix) 'Kryl'yevoy - wing-mounted)

 Klapan-avtomaht Dvoynovo Deystviya – dual-action automatic safety valve

 Kasseta/Konteyner Avareevyno-Spasahtel'naya – rescue capsule

 Kompleksnyy Agrgaht Zaprahvki – self-contained refuelling pack

 Kassetnyy Derzhahtel'  - cassette-type rack

 - chaff and flare dispenser

 Komplekt Kislorodnovo Oboroodovaniya – oxygen equipment set

 Kombinirovanny Konteiner Razvedy – combined reconnaissance pod

1. - oxygen mask
2.[katapool'tnoye] Kreslo Mikoyana – Mikoyan ejection seat

 Kislorodnyy Preebor – oxygen equipment

 Kislorodnyy Preebor Aviatsionny – aircraft oxygen equipment

 Kormovaya Pritsel'naya Stahntsiya – Starboard beam sighting station

 Kislorodnyy Preebor Zhidkosnyy – oxygen system

 [katapool'tnoye] Kreslo Sukhovo – Sukhoi [ejection] seat

 Koleso Tormoznoye - brake [equipped] wheel

 Lodka AvareeynoSpasahtel'naya – inflatable rescue dinghy

 Lodka AvareeynoSpasahtel'naya Modernizeervannaya – inflatable rescue dinghy modernised

 - cargo winch

 Levaya Pritsel'naya Stahntsiya – Port beam sighting station

 Mnogokoolpol'naya [parashootnaya] Sistema – multi-canopy [parachute] system

 M Lodka AvareeynoSpasahtel'naya-M – M single man inflatable rescue dinghy-M

 - multiple ejector rack

 Mekhanizm Razvorota Kolesa – [nosewheel] steering mechanism

 - cockpit voice recorder

 Morskoy Spasahtel'nyy Kostyum – maritime rescue suit

 - flight data recorder

 Nochnoy AeroFotoApparaht - night reconnaissance cameras

 Nosimyy Avareeynyy Zapahs – survival kit

 – Type N night reconnaissance pod

 Opticheskiy Pritsel Bombardirovochnyy – optical bomb sight)

 - fire extinguisher bottle

 OM Pritsel - Il-10m gunners gunsight

 Pritsel AN - telescopic sight

 Pulemet Aviatcionny Uchebny – aircraft gun camera

 Parashootnaya DSB- parachute droppable container

 Parashootnaya DUR - parachute droppable package

 Parashootnaya Groozovaya Sistema – parachute cargo system

1. Planeeruyushchaya Mishen – gliding target
2. Pikeeruyuschchaya Mishen – diving target

 Pritsel MP - Il-10m pilots gunsight)

 Preobrazovahtel' Odnofahznyy – AC converters

 - pitot boom

 Pritsel PD - collimating sight)

 Plot spasahtel'nyy Nadoovnoy – six man life raft

 Pritsel Strelkovyy Periskopicheskiy – flexible periscopic sight

1. Preobrazovahtel' Tryokhfahznyy – AC converters
2. Parashoot Tormoznoy – brake parachute

 Podvesnoy Toplivnyy Bahk – metal/external drop tanks

 - compressed cardboard drop tanks

 Preeyomnik Vozdooshnovo Davleniya – air pressure sensor

 – Type R Elint pod

 Regoolaytor Davleniye – pressure regulator

 Raspylitel Toornel'nyy Shirokozakhvahtnyy – wide-strip tunnel type spreader

1. - gun camera
2. - parachute

 - ground power receptacle

 Sistema Imitahtsii Otkahzov – malfunction simulation system

 - ejection seat

 Stahntsiya Kompleksnaya Aerogheofizicheskaya Tryokhmetodnaya – three method integrated airborne geophysical module

 - liquid oxygen (LOX) converter

 - anti collision beacon

 - rotating anti-coll light

 - fire warning system

 - starter-generator

 Topograficheskiy AeroFotoapparaht – topographic aircraft camera

 ToorboGenerahtor - turbo-generator

 - starter generator

 Teleskopicheskiy Strelyayushchiy Mekhanizm – telescopic firing mechanism  ejection gun

 Toorbonasosnaya Oostanovka – [air] turbo hydraulic pump

Ttpe T TV reconnaissance pod

1. Oonifi-tseerovannyy - universal)
2. Oochenik - trainee

 Oonifitseerovannyy Ballon Sharovoy – universal [fire extinguisher] spherical bottles

 Oonifitseerovannyy Khvostovoy Otsek – standardised tail compartment [for ECM])

 Universalny Podvesnoy Agregat Zapravki – in-flight refuelling pod

 Vylivnoy Aviatsionnyy Pribor – fire-fighting module

 Ventileeruyemyy Kostyum – ventilated suit

 Vysotnyy Kompenseeruyuschchiy Kostyum - altitude compensation/pressure suit

- heat insulated and waterproof maritime pressure/rescue suit

 Vintovoy Podyomnik - screw-jack

1. Verkhnaya Pritsel'naya Stahntsiya – dorsal sighting system
2. Vytyazhnaya Parashoonaya Sistema – parachute extraction system

 Vysotnyy Spasahtel'nyy Skafandr – high altitude rescue suit

 Zashchitnyy Shlem - flying helmet

References

Gordon, Yefim. Early Soviet Jet Bombers. Hinkley, Midland. 2004. 
Gordon, Yefim. Early Soviet Jet Fighters. Hinkley, Midland. 2002. 
Gordon, Yefim. Sukhoi Interceptors. Hinkley, Midland. 2004. 
Gordon, Yefim. Soviet Rocket Fighters. Hinkley, Midland. 2006.  / 
Gordon, Yefim. Soviet Heavy Interceptors. Hinkley, Midland. 2004. 
Gordon, Yefim. Lavochkin's Last Jets. Hinkley, Midland. 2004.  / 
Gordon, Yefim & Komissarov, Dmitry & Komissarov, Sergey. OKB Ilyushin. Hinkley, Midland. 2004. 
Gunston, Bill. The Osprey Encyclopaedia of Russian Aircraft 1875 – 1995. London, Osprey. 1995. 
Antonov, Vladimir & Gordon, Yefim & others. OKB Sukhoi. Leicester. Midland. 1996. 
Gordon, Yefim. Komissarov, Dmitry & Sergey. OKB Yakovlev. Hinkley. Midland. 2005. 
Gordon, Yefim & Komissarov, Dmitry. OKB Mikoyan. Hinkley, Midland. 2009. 
Gordon, Yefim. Komissarov, Dmitry & Sergey. OKB Ilyushin. Hinkley. Midland. 2004. 
Gordon, Yefim & Rigmant, Vladimir. Tupolev Tu-144. Midland. Hinkley. 2005.  
Gordon, Yefim & Komissarov, Dmitry. Antonov An-12. Midland. Hinkley. 2007.  
Gordon, Yefim & Komissarov, Dmitry & Komissarov, Sergey. Mil's Heavylift Helicopters. Hinkley, Midland. 2005. 
Gordon, Yefim. Tupolev Tu-160 "Blackjack". Hinkley, Midland. 2003. 
Gordon, Yefim & Komissarov, Dmitry. Antonov's Jet Twins. Hinkley, Midland. 2005. 
Gordon, Yefim & Komissarov, Dmitry. Kamov Ka-27/-32 Family. Hinkley, Midland. 2006.  
Gordon, Yefim & Komissarov, Dmitry. Antonov An-2. Midland. Hinkley. 2004. 
Gordon, Yefim & Rigmant, Vladimir. Tupolev Tu-114. Midland. Hinkley. 2007.  
Gordon, Yefim & Komissarov, Dmitry. Ilyushin Il-12 and Il-14. Midland. Hinkley. 2005.  
Gordon, Yefim. Yakovlev Yak-36, Yak-38 & Yak-41. Midland. Hinkley. 2008. 
Gordon, Yefim. Komissarov, Dmitry & Sergey. Antonov's Turboprop Twins. Hinkley. Midland. 2003. 
Gordon, Yefim. Myasischev M-4 and 3M. Hinkley. Midland. 2003. 
Gordon, Yefim & Rigmant, Vladimir. Tupolev Tu-104. Midland. Hinkley. 2007. 
Gordon, Yefim. Komissarov, Dmitry. Mil Mi-8/Mi-17. Hinkley. Midland. 2003. 
Gordon, Yefim & Dexter, Keith Polikarpov's I-16 Fighter. Hinkley. Midland. 2001. 
Gordon, Yefim. Mikoyan MiG-25 "Foxbat". Hinkley. Midland. 2007.  
Gordon, Yefim & Dexter, Keith Mikoyan's Piston-Engined Fighters. Hinkley. Midland. 2003. 
Gordon, Yefim & Rigmant, Vladimir. Tupolev Tu-4. Midland. Hinkley. 2002. 
Gordon, Yefim. Sukhoi S-37 and Mikoyan MFI. Midland. Hinkley. 2001 reprinted 2006.  
Gordon, Yefim. Khazanov, Dmitry. Yakovlev's Piston-Engined Fighters. Hinkley. Midland. 2002. 
Gordon, Yefim. Sal'nikov, Andrey. Zablotsky, Aleksandr. Beriev's Jet Flying Boats. Hinkley. Midland. 2006.  
Gordon, Yefim. & Dexter, Keith. Polikarpov's Biplane Fighters. Hinkley. Midland Publishing. 2002. 
Gordon, Yefim. Soviet/Russian Aircraft Weapons. Midland. 2004. 

Glossaries of Russian and USSR aviation
Aircraft engines
Wikipedia glossaries using description lists